Bijela, or also Bijela rijeka in case of rivers, may refer to:

 Bijela, Montenegro, a village near Herceg Novi, Montenegro
 Bijela, Brčko, a village in Bosnia and Herzegovina
 Bijela, Jablanica, a village in Bosnia and Herzegovina
 Bijela, Konjic, a village in Bosnia and Herzegovina
 Bijela, Višegrad, a village in Bosnia and Herzegovina
 Bijela, Croatia, a village near Sirač, Croatia
 Bijela (Karin Sea), a river in Dalmatia, Croatia
 Bijela (Pakra), a river in Slavonia, Croatia
 Bijela (Plitvice Lakes), a tributary of the Plitvice Lakes, Croatia
 Bijela or Mostarska Bijela, a river in Herzegovina, tributary of the Neretva
 Bijela (Željeznica), a river near Trnovo, tributary of the Željeznica
 , a river near Hadžići, tributary of the Lepenica
 Bijela (Bukovica), a river that flows into the Bukovica near Šavnik, Montenegro

See also
 Bela (disambiguation)
 Bela Reka (disambiguation)